Marcus Aufidius Lurco also known simply as Aufidius Lurco, was a Roman magistrate who lived in the 1st century BC. Lurco was a member of the gens Aufidia, a Roman family of plebeian status, who appeared in the Roman Republic and Roman Empire. They became a family of consular rank. Lurco originally came from Fundi (modern Fondi, Italy).

In the past he was mistakenly identified as the maternal grandfather of empress Livia.

High office
According to Suetonius, Lurco held a high office at Rome. In 61 BC, he was a Tribune of the Plebs. During his time as Tribune, he was the author of the Lex Aufidia or Lex Aufidia de ambitu. The Lex Aufidia was a law concerning the Roman assemblies or Comitia. If a candidate, promised and paid money to a tribe at the Comitia, he should pay yearly 3,000 sesterces during his life. However, if the candidate, merely promised and did not pay, the candidate should be exempt. This caused a witted argument between Lurco and Publius Clodius Pulcher.

Lurco in 59 BC, was one of the witnesses called for the defence at the impeachment of Lucius Valerius Flaccus. Between 52 BC-51 BC, Lurco prosecuted and procured for the acts of violence and the conviction of Sextus Clodius Pulcher for bringing the corpse of Publius Clodius Pulcher into the Curia Julia.

Personal life
Lurco was the first person in Rome to fatten peacocks (see peafowl) for sale and from this he became wealthy.

Research
It was in the past believed that he was the father of a daughter named Aufidia who became the mother of empress Livia Drusilla. But this is no longer accepted, as inscription shows that Livia's mother's name was Alfidia.

References

Sources
 Suetonius, The Twelve Caesars, Caligula

Tribunes of the plebs
1st-century BC Romans
Lurco, Marcus